Kunnathunad  is a Taluk in Ernakulam district in the Indian state of Kerala. Its headquarters is Perumbavoor town.

Location

History
Kunnathunad taluk was formed during the period 1762-65 along with Alengad and Paravur Taluks.

Demographics
 India census, Kunnathuna had a population of 20500 with 10290 males and 10210 females.

References

Villages in Ernakulam district